Pottan Theyyam is a vivid, lively and colorful ritualistic dance which comes in the traditional art form of theyyam, and is an essential part of the cultural heritage of Kolathunadu, a territory comprising the present Kannur district and parts of Calicut and Kasargod districts of Kerala, India. It is believed pottan theyyam is a manifestation of Shiva. In some hindu tharavads, pottan theyyam has a small hut like building called a palliyara.  Pottan theyyam is a form of resistance, symbolizing goodness that would wipe out the social evils in the community. The theyyam re-enacts in ritualistic expressions the life of those personalities who had laid down their life for a social cause and is interpreted as a social/spiritual satire that is characteristic of the theyyam's personality. Pottan theyyam is also traditionally performed with a large fire, the embers of which pottan theyyam will rest upon (with the people insisting/requesting him to get up). After the performance and customs the locals may approach and speak with pottan theyyam and receive his response and blessing.

References

Theyyam